Austin Township is an inactive township in Cass County, in the U.S. state of Missouri.

Austin Township was established in 1872, taking its name from the community of Austin, Missouri.

References

Townships in Missouri
Townships in Cass County, Missouri